In the United States Code, Title 17 outlines its copyright law.  It was codified into positive law on July 30, 1947. The latest version is from December 2016.

 —Subject Matter and Scope of Copyright
 —Copyright Ownership and Transfer
 —Duration of Copyright
 —Copyright Notice, Deposit, and Registration
 — Infringement and Remedies
 —Manufacturing Requirements and Importation
 —Copyright Office
 —Proceedings by Copyright Royalty Judges
 —Protection of Semiconductor Chip Products
 —Digital Audio Recording Devices and Media
 —Sound Recordings and Music Videos
 —Copyright Protection and Management Systems
 —Protection of Original Designs

References

External links

U.S. Code Title 17 via Wikimedia Commons
U.S. Code Title 17 via United States Copyright Office
U.S. Code Title 17 via United States House of Representatives
U.S. Code Title 17, via United States Government Printing Office
U.S. Code Title 17, via Cornell University
Title 17 rendered in verse

Title 17
17